Leonardo Ramos dos Santos, known as Leonardo (born June 9, 1992, in Ourinhos) is a Brazilian professional football player who most recently played for Hapoel Bnei Lod.

Career statistics

References

External links
 

1992 births
Living people
People from Ourinhos
Brazilian footballers
Association football forwards
Brazilian expatriate footballers
Expatriate footballers in Belarus
Expatriate footballers in Georgia (country)
Expatriate footballers in Russia
Expatriate footballers in Israel
Brazilian expatriate sportspeople in Belarus
Brazilian expatriate sportspeople in Georgia (country)
Brazilian expatriate sportspeople in Russia
Brazilian expatriate sportspeople in Israel
Liga Leumit players
FC Dinamo Minsk players
FC Dila Gori players
FC SKA-Khabarovsk players
FC Samtredia players
Hapoel Bnei Lod F.C. players
Footballers from São Paulo (state)